The 1988 Ibero-American Championships in Athletics (Spanish: III Campeonato Iberoamericano de Atletismo) was the third edition of the international athletics competition between Ibero-American nations which was held in Mexico City, Mexico from 22–24 July. A total of forty events were contested, of which 22 by male and 18 by female athletes. A total of 371 athletes and 20 nations took part in the three-day competition.

All performances were set at high altitude, which aided athletes in most events (compared to performing at lower climes) with the exception of long-distance running events. Three new events were introduced at the 1988 edition of the competition: the women's 10,000 metres, women's marathon and women's 10,000 m race walk. The men's marathon race returned to the Ibero-American Championships after a break in 1986.

Cuba topped the medal table for a third time, winning eighteen gold medals and 34 medals overall. The next best performing nation was Spain, which won nine events and had 28 medals. Mexico, the host nation, edged Brazil into fourth place with its tally of five golds and 19 medals, while the Brazilians had one less gold and two fewer in total.

Three athletes remained undefeated at the championship, taking three straight wins: José Alonso in the men's 400 m hurdles, Alberto Ruiz in the men's pole vault, and Ana Fidelia Quirot in the women's 400 m. In the heats of the men's 100 metres Robson da Silva (who went on to win a 100/200 m double) ran a time of ten seconds flat – a new South American record time.

Ana Fidelia Quirot completed a 400/800 m double. Madeline de Jesús jumped a national record to win the women's long jump and Puerto Rico's sole gold of the tournament. The Cuban women took the top two spots in all the throws, while Spain's women had 1–2 finishes in both the short sprints. The Mexican long-distance athletes excelled at high altitude: the men won the gold and silver medals in the track running and walking events, while the women also claimed the top two spots in the walks.

Medal summary

Men

Women

 † : GBR Athletics lists Colombia's Ximena Restrepo as the joint bronze medallist in the women's 200 m. However, the official results show Restrepo finished in fourth with a time of 23.46 seconds.

Medal table

Participation
Of the twenty-two members of the Asociación Iberoamericana de Atletismo, twenty presented delegations for the championships. The absent nations were Bolivia and the Dominican Republic. A record high of 371 athletes participated in the championships – more than the previous two editions combined.  However, only 344 participating athletes (including some guest athletes) were counted by analysing the official result list. The higher number probably contains coaches and/or officials registered for the event.

 (18)
 (39)
 (9)
 (3)
 (9)
 (45)
 (11)
 (17)
 (13)
 (3)
 (60)
 (1)
 (1)
 (2)
 (11)
 (14)
 (22)
 (43)
 (6)
 (17)

References

Results
El Atletismo Ibero-Americano – San Fernando 2010. RFEA. Retrieved on 2011-11-13.

Ibero-American Championships in Athletics
Ibero-American
Ibero-American
International athletics competitions hosted by Mexico
Sports competitions in Mexico City
July 1998 sports events in North America
1980s in Mexico City
July 1998 events in Mexico